Davana is a genus of moths of the family Crambidae. It contains only one described species, Davana phalantalis. The identity of this species is unknown, since the type is lost.

References

Scopariinae
Crambidae genera
Taxa named by Francis Walker (entomologist)
Monotypic moth genera